The United Nations Committee of Experts on Global Geospatial Information Management (UN-GGIM) is an initiative of the United Nations to foster the global development geospatial information.

Geospatial Societies
The UN-GGIM Geospatial Societies (UN-GGIM GS), previously Joint Board of Geospatial Information Societies (JBGIS), is a coalition recognized by the UN-GGIM:
IEEE Geoscience and Remote Sensing Society
International Association of Geodesy
International Cartographic Association
International Federation of Surveyors
International Geographical Union
International Map Industry Association
International Society for Digital Earth
International Society of Photogrammetry and Remote Sensing
Other than the full members above, there are the following observing members of the UN-GGIM GS:
International Hydrographic Organization
Urban and Regional Information Systems Association

See also
United Nations Group of Experts on Geographical Names
International Science Council#GeoUnions

References

External links
 

Organizations established by the United Nations
International geographic data and information organizations